Acaena magellanica, commonly called buzzy burr or greater burnet, is a species of flowering plant whose range includes the southern tip of South America and many subantarctic islands.

Description
The leaves are oblong to linear-lanceolate, with 5 to 10 pairs of ovate leaflets. The flower heads are globular and grow on wiry stems well clear of the foliage. They are followed by brown, prickly seed heads; the seeds have small hooks which enables them to adhere to clothing, feathers or fur.

Distribution and habitat

The species is native to the southern part of South America. Its range includes Argentina, Chile and various sub-Antarctic islands including the Falkland Islands, the Kerguelen Islands, the Prince Edward Islands, Crozet Islands, South Georgia and the South Sandwich Islands and the Heard Island and McDonald Islands. Its typical habitat is damp places such as the edge of bogs, the banks of streams, waterlogged places, meadows and forest margins.

Ecology
In South Georgia, Acaena magellanica may cover the ground in dense patches. It is deciduous, and when the leaves are shed, mosses like Tortula robusta, which grows underneath, flourish.

The Kerguelen Islands are in the Southern Indian Ocean Islands tundra ecoregion which is characterised by tussock grasses, lichens and liverworts. A. magellanica is one of the few low forbs that grew here, but the introduction of the European rabbit (Oryctolagus cuniculus), which selectively grazes the species it prefers, eliminated many of the native forbs. When the rabbit was eradicated, A. magellanica and other forbs failed to recover because years of herbivory had depleted their seed banks, and introduced species such as annual meadow grass (Poa annua), mouse-ear chickweed (Cerastium fontanum) and dandelion (Taraxacum officinale) out-competed them.

References

magellanica
Flora of southern Chile
Flora of South Argentina
Flora of the subantarctic islands
Île Amsterdam
Plants described in 1791